Benoît Lecouls (born 22 March 1978, in Agen) is a French rugby union footballer. He played for Biarritz Olympique in the Top 14 competition during the 2007/08 season, but has transferred back to Stade Toulousain during the close season. He usually plays as a prop. Prior to playing with Biarritz, Lecouls played for Toulouse and SU Agen. He has also played for the French national team, earning his first cap on 28 June 2008 against Australia.

Across his two spells at Toulouse he won the Heineken Cup twice in 2003 and 2010.

References

External links
 ERCrugby profile
 2Rugby profile

Sportspeople from Agen
1978 births
French rugby union players
Living people
Rugby union props
Biarritz Olympique players
France international rugby union players